Pulcher is Latin for "beautiful", and may refer to:

 Claudius Pulcher (disambiguation), Romans
 Publius Clodius Pulcher, Roman politician and street agitator
 Pelvicachromis pulcher

See also 

 
 Pulchella